The 1970 Cotton Bowl Classic was a postseason college football bowl game in the 1969 season, held at the Cotton Bowl in Dallas, Texas, on Thursday, January 1, 1970. The game matched the top-ranked Texas Longhorns  and the #9 Notre Dame Fighting Irish .

Background
Texas was looking to win its second unanimous national championship in seven seasons, previously won in 1963. The Longhorns, who had already won the national championship of the UPI coaches poll prior to the Cotton Bowl, finished with a perfect season and a second straight Southwest Conference championship. The Associated Press would conduct a final poll following the bowl games.

This was independent Notre Dame's first postseason appearance since the 1925 Rose Bowl, 45 years earlier.

By a vote of its players in mid-November, second-ranked Penn State (10–0) opted to return to the Orange Bowl, and faced #6 Missouri  Penn State had several black players and wished to avoid Dallas due to segregation issues. At the time, the top-ranked team was defending champion Ohio State, who lost the next week at Michigan.

Game summary
On a cool, clear day in Dallas, the two teams were even in first downs and were different in total yards by only 28. Both had over 70 offensive plays, the Irish had their passing attack and the Longhorns with their running attack. Notre Dame scored the first ten points; a Scott Hempel made a short field goal in the first quarter and Joe Theismann threw a 54-yard touchdown pass to Tom Gatewood early in the second. After the Irish kickoff, Texas went on a 74-yard drive that culminated with a one-yard Jim Bertelsen touchdown run that made the score 10–7 at halftime. After a scoreless third, the fourth quarter saw three touchdowns, each changing the lead. Longhorn Ted Koy culminated a 77-yard drive with his touchdown run with ten minutes remaining to give Texas a 14–10 advantage.

Theismann then led the Irish on an 80-yard drive and threw a 24-yard pass to Jim Yoder for a 17–14 lead with 6:52 left. The Longhorns then went on a 76-yard drive that included a fourth down pass from James Street to Cotton Speyrer that went eight yards down to the two. On third down from the one, Billy Dale's touchdown plunge came with 68 seconds remaining, too little time for the Irish as Texas secured its second consensus national championship in school history.

Despite the loss, Notre Dame climbed four spots in the final AP poll, ending at fifth.

References

Cotton Bowl Classic
Cotton Bowl Classic
Notre Dame Fighting Irish football bowl games
Texas Longhorns football bowl games
January 1970 sports events in the United States
Cotton Bowl